Ready Eddie is Eddie Money's tenth studio album, released in 1999.

Track listing
"Ready to Rock" (Curt Coumo, Jake Hooker, Eddie Money, Frankie Sullivan) - 4:21
"Don't Say No Tonight" (Coumo, Money, Sullivan) - 5:05
"So Cold Tonight" (Coumo, Money, Sullivan) - 4:24
"Let It Go" (Dedicated to "Jack and Diane") (Coumo, Money, Sullivan, Larry Lee) - 4:06
"Turn the Light Off" (Coumo, Money, Sullivan) - 3:18
"It's Gotta Be Love" (Coumo, Money, Sullivan) - 4:30
"Can't Go On"  (Coumo, Money, Sullivan) - 5:11
"Nobody Knows" (John Nelson, Money) - 3:26
"When You Gonna Satisfy Me" (Monty Byrom, Money, Danny Chauncey, Ira Walker) - 4:19
"Need a Little Rock" (Eddie Rice) - 3:26
"Broken Down Chevy (God Only Knows)" (John Nelson, Money) - 4:21

Production
Executive producer: Jake Hooker
Produced by Curt Coumo, Eddie Money and Frankie Sullivan
Engineers: Shawn Berman, Curt Coumo, Jim Mitchell, Posie Muliadi, Frankie Sullivan
Mixing: Frank Filipetti, Frankie Sullivan

Personnel
Eddie Money: lead and backing vocals
Tom Girvin: guitars
Frankie Sullivan: guitars, bass guitar
Curt Coumo: keyboards, piano
Trent Stroh: bass guitar
Kenny Aronoff: drums, percussion

Background singers
 Chris Cameron, Curt Cuomo, Larry Lee, Eddie Money, Frankie Sullivan

1999 albums
Eddie Money albums
CMC International albums